Upasna Mohapatra is a youth leader of the Bharatiya Janata Party.

Biography
Hailing from Brahmagiri, Odisha, Mohapatra is the great granddaughter of Bakshi Jagabandhu Bidyadhar who pioneered the Paika rebellion in East India which happens to be the very first rebellion against the British empire (1817), much before the Sepoy mutiny (1857).
Her political career has been passed on to her from her late father Lalatendu Bidyadhar Mohapatra who was a leader of Odisha Congress.
She studied in two private schools of Bhubaneswar and Cuttack and pursued higher studies in Sophia College, Mumbai from 2015.

Although Mohapatra had not confirmed her political career until October 2017  she had been in the limelight after being active in the 2014 general elections and raising her voice in several political and social matters. She has been prominent in the regional media.

On 14 October 2017 she joined the BJP under the leadership of Dharmendra Pradhan. She was appointed the state coordinator of BJP in August 2018 and  state convener of the I support Modi campaign.

Upasna spearheaded the Brahmagiri assembly campaign for her uncle Lalitendu Bidyadhar Mohapatra in the 2019 Assembly elections where he took the seat of Brahmagiri and is the current MLA of Brahmagiri Assembly segment.

In June 2019, shortly after the announcement of the election results, Upasna got engaged to Mumbai-based businessman Subhransu Sekhar Biswal in a formal ceremony in Bhubaneswar.

Subhransu and Upasna tied the knot on 17.02.2021 in an intimate ceremony surrounded by friends and family.

On March 16, 2021 Mahapatra along with around 20 people allegedly roughed up tenants of a house in Nayapalli, Bhubaneswar. Mahapatra was booked for assaulting the tenant, 17 people were arrested over the incident.

References

1996 births
Living people
Bharatiya Janata Party politicians from Odisha
Women members of the Odisha Legislative Assembly
Odisha MLAs 2019–2024
21st-century Indian women politicians